= Habseligkeiten =

Paltry belongings of an almost penniless person

This German word is usually used in its plural form Habseligkeiten. It refers to the paltry belongings of an almost penniless person. "Habseligkeiten" was chosen as the most beautiful German word in October 2004 in a competition initiated by the Goethe Institute and the Council for the German Language. The nomination points out that the word combines two completely opposite areas of life: worldly belongings ("hab" from "haben", "to have") and the eternal search for happiness ("Seligkeit", a state of bliss or of being blessed). It argues that this tension causes the observer to feel sympathy towards the owner of such belongings.

The Council for the German Language was criticized for its choice because the nomination is etymologically wrong. The word does not consist of the halves "hab" and "seligkeiten", but instead of "habsal" and "keit", where "habsal" is a material possession of small value and "keit" is a common suffix. Therefore, the word does not actually refer to the feeling of happiness that was attributed to it in the nomination.
